Reepham is a market town and civil parish in the Broadland district of Norfolk, England. Reepham is situated on the B1145 road between the Bure and Wensum valleys.

History
Reepham has had market town status since 1277; a sign to mark this has recently been erected. The town has undergone significant development throughout its life, with the housing in the area showing a mix of vintages, styles and purposes.

Recent discoveries 
In June 2021, archaeologists announced the discovery of gold coins thought to have been lost in the Black Death and dated back to the reign of Edward III near Reepham. According to researcher Helen Geake, one of the rare coins was 23 karat and known as a leopard, while other was called a noble. They were equal to £12,000 today and probably would have been owned by high ranked person.

Today
Recent housing developments have mostly been on brownfield land so have not significantly expanded the perimeter of the town.

The town has both a secondary school, Reepham High School and College, which achieved the highest grade – Outstanding – in every category in its 2008 Ofsted inspection, and a primary school.

The Reepham Society is a registered charity, set up in 1976 to stimulate public interest in Reepham, Hackford, Kerdiston, Salle and Whitwell. The town was one of the filming locations of the Agatha Christie's Poirot episode The Tragedy at Marsdon Manor.

Religion

Twin churches
Reepham is one of only two places in Europe to have three churches on the same site. Reepham's church of St. Mary is joined by its choir vestry to St. Michael's, Whitwell. The third church (All Saints') belonged to Hackford but burned down in 1543 and now only a fragment of the tower wall remains on the left of the path leading towards the market place. The three churches were built on their parish boundaries.

Reepham church contains the fine tomb of Sir Roger de Kerdiston, 1337; Whitwell church has a Jacobean pulpit.

Shrine of Our Lady of Reepham
In medieval times, Reepham Church was an important place of pilgrimage. Although it was less famous than the shrine at Walsingham, people came on pilgrimage to Reepham to visit the image of Our Lady of Reepham, which had many miracles attributed to it. What form this image took is unknown. It may have been a statue, or perhaps a wood carving. There is evidence to suggest its importance and it is mentioned in the 15th-century will of Alice Cook of Horstead, who wrote that after her death, in order to smooth her passage from this world to the next, she would "Have a man goo a pilgrimage to our Lady of Reifham".

Town sign
The town sign was designed by the local high school and installed in 1992. Carved by the then head of Craft Design & Technology Mr. Geldard, and painted by male student Kerry Daniels, it depicts three of each of the following elements: churches, villagers, farm labourers, sheep, lambs and "sisters" and refers to a myth that three sisters were each responsible for building a church. In fact, the three churches were built over several generations.

Transport

Roads
The B1145, which connects King's Lynn with Mundesley, runs through the town.

Railway
Reepham is no longer connected to the National Rail network.  The nearest station is in Norwich, 14 miles away.

History
By 1882, the town had two stations, located on different tracks and each managed by a separate railway company. Whitwell station was on the M&GN's Norwich City to Melton Constable branch line. Reepham station was on the GEN's Wroxham to County School station line. In 1960, the tracks were joined by the construction of the Themelthorpe Curve; the work was carried out by British Rail, to facilitate the movement of concrete products from Lenwade.

Today, the railway trackbed forms the Marriott's Way, a long-distance footpath between Norwich and Aylsham; both former stations are notable stops on the path.

Buses
Sanders Coaches provide bus services to and from the town. The most regular services are on routes 43/A/B to Aylsham and Norwich.

Cycling
National Cycle Route 1 passes through the town.

Sport
The Reepham and Salle Cricket Club have their home ground in Salle, a village  to the north of the town.

Notable residents
George Goodwin Kilburne (1839–1924), artist
Keith Simpson, Conservative MP for Broadland

References

External links

Reepham Town Council
Our Lady of Reepham

 
Towns in Norfolk
Market towns in Norfolk
Broadland
Civil parishes in Norfolk